Jaxson Kirkland (born July 30, 1998) is an American football offensive tackle who currently plays for the Washington Huskies.

Early life and high school
Kirkland grew up in Camas, Washington and attended Jesuit High School. He was rated a three-star recruit and initially committed to play college football at UCLA during the summer before his senior year. Kirkland decommitted from UCLA at the end of his senior football season and ultimately signed a letter of intent to play at Washington over an offer from Oregon.

College career
Kirkland redshirted his true freshman season at Washington. He was named the Huskies starting right guard going into his redshirt freshman season and started all 14 of the Huskies' games. Kirkland started the first 11 games of his redshirt sophomore season before sustaining an injury. He moved from right guard to left tackle going into the 2020 season and was named first team All-Pac-12 Conference. Kirkland considered entering the 2021 NFL Draft, but opted to return to Washington for a fifth season. He entered his fifth season as one of the top offensive tackle prospects for the 2022 NFL Draft. Kirkland repeated as a first team All-Pac-12 selection after starting ten games with two games missed to an ankle injury in 2021 and declared for the 2022 NFL Draft at the end of the season. He opted out of the draft after it was discovered that his ankle injury was more severe than previously thought.

References

External links 
 Washington Huskies bio

Living people
American football offensive tackles
Washington Huskies football players
Players of American football from Oregon
1998 births